Bundibugyo General Hospital, also Bundibugyo District Hospital or Bundibugyo Hospital, is a hospital in the Western Region of Uganda.

Location
The coordinates of Bundibugyo General Hospital are:0°42'11.0"N 30°03'49.0"E, Latitude:0.703056; Longitude:30.063611).

Overview
Bundibugyo Hospital is a public hospital, funded by the Uganda Ministry of Health. General care in the hospital is free. The facility was founded in 1969 by the government of Prime minister Milton Obote. The hospital infrastructure and equipment has been neglected and is in very poor condition. The hospital offers services from the district of Bundibugyo and Ntoroko and from neighboring communities in the Democratic Republic of the Congo. In 2015, the government of Uganda began renovating certain hospitals in the country, including this hospital.

See also
 List of hospitals in Uganda

References

External links
Website of Uganda Ministry of Health
 Bundibugyo Hospital Cleaners lay down their tools for non-payment of wages

Hospitals in Uganda
Hospitals established in 1969
1969 establishments in Uganda
Bundibugyo District
Rwenzururu sub-region
Western Region, Uganda